Sania Saleh (1935–1985; Arabic: سنية صالح)  was a Syrian writer and poet, who wrote and published several poetry collections. Some of her poetry has been translated into English by Marilyn Hacker.

Biography
Sania Saleh was born in the city of Masyaf, in the Hama Governorate, Syria. She met the Syrian writer Mohammad al-Maghut in the 1950s at the house of the Syrian poet Adunis in Beirut. In the late 1960s she married Mohammad al-Maghut while she was still a student in the college of literature at the University of Damascus, Syria. They had two daughters together and named them Sham and Salafa.

In 1985, Sania Saleh died at a hospital in Paris after having battled an illness for 10 months.

The Egyptian poet Iman Mersal has lamented that fact Saleh's poetry was not more widely known when Mersal was young:

Works 
 Tight Time (1964) (original title: al-Zaman al-Dayeq)
 Execution Ink (1970) (original title: Hebr al-Idam)
 Zikr al-Ward (1988)
 Dust (1982) (original title: al-Ghubar)

Poetry translated into English
  Republished in

Awards
 An-Nahar newspaper award for best modern poem (1961)
 Hawaa magazine award for short stories (1964)
 Al Hasnaa magazine award for poetry (1967)

References

1935 births
1985 deaths
Syrian women poets
20th-century Syrian poets
20th-century Syrian women writers
People from Hama Governorate